Krum Lyubomirov Sirakov (born 15 August 1986), better known mononymously as Krum is a Bulgarian pop and pop-folk singer.

Career
Born on August 15, 1986 in Sofia. His mother's name is Boryana and his father's name is Lubomir. However, Krum owes his affinity for music to another, and this is his grandmother (a journalist!), Who one day took his hand and took him to the music school in the neighborhood. Krum studied music specializing in the flute. He appeared in the program BG Future Stars. He started his career by appearing on television in the year 2006. Deep Zone Project launched his debut single "Тази нощ" (Tonight). In 2009, he started singing professionally, focusing on pop music and pop-folk music. His songs were popular in Bulgaria. In 2009, he also took part in the Bulgarian TV dance competition VIP Dance. His debut album Не си играй с мен arranged by Miro Gechev (Миро Гечев) was released by ARA MUSIC that had signed him.

Krum won "Best New Artist" in 2006, "Best Progressive Performer" in 2007 and "Best music video" in 2008 and "Best Duet of Year" in 2009, the latter for his collaboration with singer Emanuela.

Krum participates annually in the national campaign to prevent human trafficking. In 2010, Krum performed in the concert "Balkan music" where countries from all over the Balkans compete.

In 2012, Krum launched his own fashion line called "By Krum".

He appeared in the reality television series Survivor: Cambodia in the fifth season of the show in Bulgaria.

In 2016, he left Payner (in Bulgarian Пайнер) to join Otsko (in Bulgarian Оцко) newly established company Hit Mix Music.

Discography

Albums
Не си играй с мен (English: Don't play with me)
Не друг, а аз (English: No other, it's me)

Videoclips
2006: Докога (English: Till when)
2006: Мислите ми плени /remix/ (English: You captured my dreams)
2007: Любовен дует (English: Love duet)
2008: Винаги помни (English: Always remember)
2008: Модел на греха (English: Model of the sin)
2009: В едно огледало (с Миро) (English: In one mirror, feat. Miro)
2009: С близалка в ръка (English: With lollipop in the hand)
2009: Нищо не знаеш (с Емануела)(English: You don't know nothing feat. Emanuela)
2009: Заповядвам ти (English: I command You)
2010: Не друг, а аз (English: No other, I)
2010: Да свършим ТВ Версия (English: to end) (Tv version)
2010: Стоп (със Sanja Gjosevska) (English: Stop)
2010: Прецака ме (English: You Fraud Me feat. Sanja Gjosevska)
2010: Буба лази (trio with Debora and Kristiana)
2010: Трудна (English: Hard Woman)
2011: Танци-манци (English: Dances)
2011: Do It, Baby
2011: Руска рулетка (Russian Roulette)
2011: Касичка прасе (Box Pig)
2012: Вреден (Harmful)
2013: Отровна (Poison)
2013: Остани (Stay)
2013: Целувай и хапи (Kiss and bite) (with Ani Hoang)
2013: Най-добрата (The best)
2013: Боклук (Trash)
2014: И да пишат, че съм гей (And write that I'm gay)
2014: Бий ме, обичам те (Fight me, I love you)
2014: Безчувствен (Senseless)
2015: Забрави (feat. Anelia) (Forget it)
2015: Скорпион (Scorpion) (feat. Emanuela)
2016: Както желаете, мис (As you wish, Miss)
2016: Ала-бала
2016: Твойта кожа (with Andrea) (Your skin)
2017: Рицар (Knight)
2018: ЧИКИ-РИКИ (CHIKI-RIKI) (With SOFI MARINOVA)

References

1986 births
Living people
21st-century Bulgarian male singers
Bulgarian pop singers
Bulgarian folk-pop singers